The 1935 Fresno State Bulldogs football team represented Fresno State Normal School—now known as California State University, Fresno—during the 1935 college football season.

Fresno State competed in the Far Western Conference (FWC). The 1935 team was led by third-year head coach Leo Harris and played home games at Fresno State College Stadium on the campus of Fresno City College in Fresno, California. They finished the season as champion of the FWC, with a record of six wins and three losses (6–3, 4–0 FWC). The Bulldogs outscored their opponents 199–84 for the season, including holding their opponents under 10 points in six of the nine games.

Schedule

Notes

References

Fresno State
Fresno State Bulldogs football seasons
Northern California Athletic Conference football champion seasons
Fresno State Bulldogs football